|}

This is a list of House of Assembly results for the 1986 Tasmanian election.

Results by division

Bass

Braddon

Denison

Franklin

Lyons

See also 

1986 Tasmanian state election
Members of the Tasmanian House of Assembly, 1986–1989

References 

Results of Tasmanian elections